Consular nonreviewability (sometimes written as consular non-reviewability, and also called consular absolutism) refers to the doctrine in immigration law in the United States where the visa decisions made by United States consular officers (Foreign Service Officers working for the United States Department of State) cannot be appealed in the United States judicial system. It is closely related to the plenary power doctrine that immunizes from judicial review the substantive immigration decisions of the United States Congress and the executive branch of the United States government.

Since the alien denied entry at a consulate abroad was not subject to the jurisdiction of the United States, it is not a priori clear whether the alien has standing to sue in the US justice system. However, the principle of consular nonreviewability goes further than simply denying aliens standing; it also creates a strong presumption against judicial review of consular decisions requested by United States citizens and residents affected by them.

Distinction between Department of State decisions, USCIS decisions, and ICE/CBP immigration enforcement decisions 

Consular nonreviewability specifically applies to decisions made by consular officers representing the United States in other countries, who are employees of the United States Department of State. It does not apply to decisions made by United States Citizenship and Immigration Services.

For many immigrant and non-immigrant visas, the approval of a petition or application from the USCIS is a prerequisite for obtaining the visa. However, the visa may be denied despite the USCIS application having been approved, and consular nonreviewability insulates such decisions from challenge. For instance, in the case of Kerry v. Din (2015) the applicant whose visa was denied had gotten USCIS approval through a Form I-130 filed by his wife, but his visa was nonetheless denied and the United States government claimed that detailed explanation of the reason of denial was not necessary.

Consular nonreviewability also does not apply to decisions made by U.S. Customs and Border Protection officers when deciding whether to allow an alien to enter or not enter the United States at a designated port of entry, or to immigration enforcement actions taken by U.S. Immigration and Customs Enforcement. However, in practice, the avenues of legal redress for the actions of these agencies are limited, owing to the plenary power doctrine.

Review and reconsideration within the Department of State 

Consular nonreviewability does not mean that the Department of State cannot reconsider its immigration decisions. There are a number of avenues for redress within the Department of State for somebody whose visa is denied.

Re-application and submission of additional information 

 Section 214(b) refusals: These are refusals for non-immigrant visas where the consular officer is unconvinced of the applicant's non-immigrant intent. This ground of refusal cannot be appealed, but the applicant is free to apply again for a visa (paying the visa fee again). Past refusals are on the record and the applicant is therefore in principle expected to show a change in circumstances to explain why he/she would now qualify for a visa. However, since different consular officers make decisions based on their own discretion the applicant may well qualify when applying the second time despite no change to circumstances.
 Section 221(g) refusals: These "quasi-refusals" mean that the consular officer has deferred a final decision on the applicant, and will complete the decision once additional information from the applicant or the United States government becomes available. If the pending information needs to come from the applicant, there is a time limit of one year. If the applicant exceeds the time limit, the applicant needs to re-apply. If the pending information needs to come from the United States government, there is no time limit. The various grounds for such quasi-refusals:
 Suspension of Action on Petition
 Addition evidence is required
 Withdrawal of application (while it is pending adjudication)

Supervisorial review 

The Code of Federal Regulations states that all non-immigrant visa denials should be reviewed by a supervisor. However, the Foreign Affairs Manual states that as many refusals as practical, but not fewer than 20%, should be reviewed, as soon as possible, but deferrable by up to 120 days if the applicant wishes to submit additional evidence. For immigrant visa applications, the review must take place as soon as administratively feasible (but within 30 days) unless the applicant wishes to submit additional evidence (in which case there is no time limit). Supervisorial review of 214(b) refusals (failure to establish non-immigrant intent) require the supervisor to re-interview the applicant.

It may be possible to appeal a decision within a consulate 

In some limited circumstances, the decisions of consular officers may be appealed within the consulate. However, there are no procedural guarantees of this.

Scope and exceptions 

A few exceptions to the doctrine of consular nonreviewability have emerged over the years:

 The Mandel test, namely, that the consulate did not provide a "facially legitimate and bona fide" reason for the rejection, and it might infringe on the constitutional rights of United States citizens.
 In cases where a consular officer rejects the application based on an underlying statute or regulation, it may sometimes be appealed on these two grounds:
 Claims that the underlying statute or regulation being applied is unconstitutional.
 Claims that the consular officer made a procedural error in applying the statute.

History 

Since it almost by definition excludes judicial review, cases challenging the doctrine of consular nonreviewability are heard quite rarely in court. However, the doctrine has evolved somewhat in response to court challenges.

Post-Chinese Exclusion Act: The Chinese Exclusion Case (1889) 

Some important precedents regarding judicial reviewability of immigration decisions were set in the aftermath of the 1882 Chinese Exclusion Act and Immigration Act of 1882. The Chinese Exclusion Act was the first federal immigration act to significantly affect migration flows, and the Immigration Act of 1882 gave enforcement teeth to this law by making immigration enforcement a federal matter. At this time, the determination regarding whether an alien could enter the United States was by the officer at the designated port of entry. When the officer decided not to admit the alien, the alien was generally detained on the vessel he or she had arrived on and then returned to his or her home country by the captain of the vessel. Since the vessel would generally be harbored in the United States prior to departure, the alien could file a writ of habeas corpus and have his or her refusal challenged in court, at least in principle. A few such cases shortly after the passage of the Chinese Exclusion Act helped delineate the scope of judicial review for decisions on whether to admit an alien.

The most significant case was Chae Chan Ping v. United States (1889), also called the Chinese Exclusion Case. Chae Chan Ping, a Chinese-born United States resident was denied re-entry to the United States after a trip to China, in accordance with the Scott Act, which had passed after his departure to China but prior to his return arrival. He filed a lawsuit against the United States government, and lost. In its decision, the Supreme Court wrote that the power to exclude foreigners rested with the executive branch of the government, and any international grievances arising from this were the province of the political department of the government.

Other cases that occurred in subsequent years further strengthened the plenary power doctrine, though they related to the authority to deny entry and deport people and did not address consular decisions. These included Fong Yue Ting v. United States (1893), Lem Moon Sing v. United States (1895), and United States v. Ju Toy (1905).

Post-Immigration Act of 1924: London v. Phelps (1927) and Ulrich v. Kellogg (1929) 

Prior to World War I, passports and visas were not necessary to enter the United States at a designated port of entry. In 1917 (during World War I), the United States Department of State and United States Department of Labor issued a joint order to diplomatic, consular, and immigration officers requiring that noncitizens have a passport and visa before seeking entry to the United States. In 1918, these requirements were made long-term by the United States Congress. Initially, consular officers issuing visas did not check for grounds of inadmissibility; rather, they simply issued the visa and informed the applicant of potential grounds for inadmissibility, leaving the task of determining inadmissibility to the officer at the port of entry. This led to the problem of people undertaking an expensive journey and then being rejected at the port of entry. In 1924, Congress enacted a provision requiring consular officers to make a determination of admissibility and issue the visa only if they were satisfied. While the officer at the border still had final say on whether to admit the alien (i.e., the alien could be denied entry despite having a valid visa), the visa served an important prior screening and filtering role.

At the same time, the United States moved in the direction of more comprehensive restrictions on immigration from around the world. Specifically, the Emergency Quota Act of 1921 restricted annual immigration from a country to no more than 3% of the population of people from that country in the United States as of the U.S. Census of 1910; the Immigration Act of 1924 (The Johnson-Reed Act) further reduced this to 2%. While this effectively limited immigration from most countries to lower than the levels at that time, the primary purpose of the law was to clamp down on immigration from Southern and Eastern Europe. It also significantly affected immigration from Africa and Asia.

The combination of the increased degree of immigration restriction and the shifting of immigration decisions towards consulates abroad gave consular decisions considerable significance.

Two cases in the immediate aftermath of the Immigration Act of 1924 have been cited as precedents for consular nonreviewability:

 United States ex rel. London v. Phelps 22 F. 2d 288 (2d Cir. 1927): Mrs. London, who lived in Canada, requested a visa to visit her children in New York City. Her visa was denied. She appeared at the border where she was refused entry. She filed a habeas corpus petition against the U.S. immigration inspector, arguing that as a resident of Canada she was not required to have a visa to travel to the United States. She also argued that the issuance of visas was simply a ministerial act, and therefore the decision not to grant her a visa was wrong as well. The case was decided against Mrs. London. The Phelps court's decision noted that "Unjustifiable refusal to vise a passport [...] is beyond the jurisdiction of the court." While the case has been cited as a precedent for consular nonreviewability, some have argued that it addressed only the question of what was relevant to that particular court case.
 United States ex rel. Ulrich v. Kellogg 30 F. 2d 984, 985 (D.C. Cir. 1929): The petitioner, a U.S. citizen, filed a petition for writ of mandamus asking the court to order the U.S. consulate in Berlin to issue a visa to his wife in Germany. The consulate had refused to issue her a visa based on the claim that she had previously committed larceny, considered a crime of moral turpitude. The court reviewed the decision and found that the conviction for larceny constituted a crime of moral turpitude, and therefore made her inadmissible. It further noted that, both on the language of the relevant statutes, the power to issue or deny visas lay with consular officers, not with the Secretary of State, and therefore the Secretary of State could not order a consular officer to change a visa decision.

The Administrative Procedure Act (1946), Knauff v. Shaughnessy (1950), and reliance on the plenary power doctrine 

Prior to 1946, there was no barrier in principle to judicial review of consular decisions, but there was no clear protocol in general for challenging decisions by government agencies in courts. The Administrative Procedure Act of 1946 changed this; Section 10 of the APA permitted judicial review for any person "adversely affected or aggrieved" by the actions of a government agency. Also, Section 279 of the Immigration and Nationality Act of 1952 explicitly gave the courts jurisdiction over "all causes" arising under Title II of the statute. This meant that cases would be brought to the courts the decisions on which would help clarify their thinking on consular nonreviewability.

Courts' initial response to efforts to challenge consular decisions was to rely on the plenary power doctrine. The first decision establishing the plenary power doctrine in the post-APA era was Knauff v. Shaughnessy (1950). According to the Knauff court, "whatever the procedure authorized by Congress, it is due process as far as an alien denied entry is concerned."

In this case, Knauff, the alien wife of a citizen who had served for the United States in World War II sought admission to the United States (and would ordinarily have been eligible based on the War Brides Act), but was denied admission by the United States based on confidential information. The Attorney General denied a hearing, arguing that a hearing would reveal sensitive information that would be detrimental to the interests of the United States. The Supreme Court upheld the Attorney General's decision, clarifying that the denial of entry to the alien wife was not unconstitutional, and that it is "not within the province of any court, unless expressly authorized by law, to review the determination of the political branch of Government to exclude a certain alien."

Two other court decisions at the time played some role in establishing the doctrine of consular nonreviewability:

 Licea-Gomez v. Pilliod, 193 F. Supp. 577 (N.D. Ill. 1960): The petitioner was excluded for lacking a visa, and filed a complaint under the APA challenging both the exclusion order and the consular officer's refusal to issue a visa. The court acknowledged that the petitioner could challenge the exclusion under the APA, but declined to consider the arguments relating to the denial of the visa.
 Loza-Bedoya v. INS, 410 F.2d 343 (9th Cir. 1969): The INS had incorrectly informed the U.S. consulate that Loza-Bedoya had been involved with criminal activity, and the consulate denied a visa based on that. He, however, re-entered the United States without inspection and was later placed in deportation proceedings. He filed a motion with the Board of Immigration Appeals to reopen, but was denied, and he challenged this in court, but the court sided with the BIA.

Kleindienst v. Mandel (1972) 

Kleindienst v. Mandel, 408 U.S 753 (1972) was a United States Supreme Court decision that upheld that the United States Attorney General has the right to refuse somebody's entry to the United States, as he has been empowered to do so in 212 (a) (28) of the Immigration and Nationality Act of 1952.

This action was brought to compel Attorney General Kleindienst to grant a temporary nonimmigrant visa to a Belgian journalist and Marxian theoretician whom the American plaintiff-appellees, Ernest Mandel et al., had invited to participate in academic conferences and discussions in the US. The alien had been found ineligible for admission under 212 (a) (28) (D) and (G) (v) of the Immigration and Nationality Act of 1952, barring those who advocate or publish "the economic, international, and governmental doctrines of world communism." Kleindienst had declined to waive ineligibility as he has the power to do under 212 (d) of the Act, basing his decision on unscheduled activities engaged in by the alien on a previous visit to the United States, when a waiver was granted.

Even though it upheld consular nonreviewability, the opinion offered in the Kleindienst v. Mandel case paved the way for potential challenges to consular decisions. Specifically, Kleindienst v. Mandel rejected judicial review because it ruled that the consulate had offered a "bona fide and facially legitimate" reason for rejecting the visa. This suggested that in cases where such a reason was not provided, the consular decision may be subject to judicial review. This criterion for whether a consular decision might be eligible for judicial review would come to be known as the Mandel test.

Kerry v. Din (2015) 

Kerry v. Din (576 U.S. 86) (2015) was a United States Supreme Court decision that upheld the doctrine of consular nonreviewability. The case was filed by Fauzia Din, a United States citizen who had arrived in the country as a refugee from Afghanistan in 2000. In September 2006, she married Kanishka Berashk, a citizen of Afghanistan, who had worked as a civil servant under the Taliban regime. Din then submitted a Form I-130 petition to the United States Citizenship and Immigration Services, sponsoring Berashk under the Immediate Relative category. The petition was approved by the USCIS.

Berashk used the approved Form I-130 to apply for a visa to enter the United States. However, in June 2009, he was informed that his visa was denied; the stated reason for the denial was that he had provided material support to a terrorist but no further details were provided. Din filed suit in the United States District Court for the Northern District of California arguing that the government denied her due process of law by depriving her of her "constitutional right to live in the United States with her spouse." The District Court rejected her argument, but the Ninth Circuit Court of Appeals reversed. The United States appealed the reversal in the Supreme Court. Per the Mandel test, there were two questions at hand:

 Was a constitutional right of Fauzia Din, a United States citizen, infringed upon?
 Was the reason offered by the consulate for rejecting Berashk's visa "bona fide and facially legitimate" per Mandel?

The case was won by the United States, with the Supreme Court split in its opinion. Antonin Scalia, John G. Roberts, and Clarence Thomas wrote plurality opinions. Anthony Kennedy and Samuel Alito concurred.

Scalia's opinion rejected (1), i.e., he argued that the denial of a visa did not implicate a fundamental liberty interest, and that it differed from Loving v. Virginia in that the right to marriage was not being questioned. Kennedy's opinion differed from Scalia's in that he did not come to a definite conclusion regarding (1), but instead he rejected (2), arguing that even if Din's liberty was infringed upon, the reason explanation offered by the consulate for the denial (i.e., that Berashk had provided material support to a terrorist organization) fulfilled the government's obligations, and that further details were not required in cases where the application was denied due to terrorism or national security concerns.

Stephen Breyer wrote a dissenting opinion answering both (1) and (2) in the affirmative, in which he was joined by Ruth Bader Ginsburg, Sonia Sotomayor, and Elena Kagan. Breyer's dissent argued that forbidding people from living together did effectively impede the right to marry, and that the level of explanation offered for the denial was inadequate, similar to "telling a criminal defendant that he is accused of breaking the law."

Although Kerry v. Din upheld the doctrine of consular nonreviewability, legal commentators viewed it as not carrying much additional weight as a precedent since the decision was a plurality opinion.

See also 

 Plenary power
 Administrative Procedure Act (United States)

References 

Immigration to the United States